Jussi Heikki Puumala (20 December 1878 – 1 October 1953) was a Finnish farmer and politician. He was born in Noormarkku and was a member of the Parliament of Finland, representing the People's Party from 1917 to 1918 and the National Coalition Party from 1918 to 1919.

References

1878 births
1953 deaths
People from Pori
People from Turku and Pori Province (Grand Duchy of Finland)
People's Party (Finland, 1917) politicians
National Coalition Party politicians
Members of the Parliament of Finland (1917–19)
People of the Finnish Civil War (White side)
University of Helsinki alumni